The 2011 Sunshine Tour is the 12th season of professional golf tournaments since the southern Africa based Sunshine Tour was relaunched in 2000, and the 5th since the tour switched a calendar based season in 2007. The Sunshine Tour represents the highest level of competition for male professional golfers in the region.

The tour is based predominantly in South Africa with other events being held in neighbouring countries, including Zimbabwe, Swaziland, Zambia and Namibia.

As usual, the tour consists of two distinct parts, commonly referred to as the "Summer Swing" and the "Winter Swing". Tournaments held during the Summer Swing generally have much higher prize funds, attract stronger fields, and are the only tournaments on the tour to carry world ranking points, with some events being co-sanctioned with the European Tour. Since the tour switched to a calendar based season, this part of the tour has been split in two, with some events being held at the start of the year, and the remainder in December.

Schedule
The following table lists official events during the 2011 season.

Order of Merit
The Order of Merit was based on prize money won during the season, calculated in South African rand.

Charl Schwartzel and Louis Oosthuizen were ineligible for the Order of Merit having only played in three and one tournaments, respectively, during the season. Schwartzel earned R2,211,553 and Oosthuizen earned R1,394,800 from those events.

Notes

References

External links

Sunshine Tour
Sunshine Tour